Hijack was a Thai boy band famous and popular in the 1990s under RS Promotion. They are the first boy band of RS label.

History
All four members of this band were former dancers who were used as back-up dancers for many singers. Hijack was the first boy band of RS Promotion.

The band released two studio albums in 1993 and 1994, and a one-off special album with the Raptor.

While promoting the release of their third studio album, band member Phi–Phiraphan seriously injured his foot. Because of this they decided to eventually split up.

During their most famous period Hijack had been interviewed by two foreign media companies; NHK of Japan and Singapore MTV. They were compared with Shonentai, the famous Japanese boy band of the same period.

In 2017 Hijack had reunion in Por Lor Ruk Lae Kid Tung (ปล. รักและคิดถึง) as part of A-pop Bunterng 34 TV Program on Amarin TV channel.

Member
Jaturong "X" Kolimart (เอ็กซ์: จตุรงค์ โกลิมาศ)
Phiraphan "Phi" Kumarasith (ผี: พีรพันธุ์ กุมารสิทธิ์)
Apichart "Toi" Kaimook (ต๋อย: อภิชาติ ไข่มุกข์)
Phichai "James" Unakul (เจมส์: พิชัย อูนากุล)

Discography
Studio albums
Form Lon Mai Tong Keb (ฟอร์มหล่นไม่ต้องเก็บ) 1993
Len Jeb Jeb (เล่นเจ็บเจ็บ) 1994
Compilation albums
R.S. Unplugged 1994
Compilation with Raptor (with special single Ya Kid Wa Ther Mai Mee Kari; อย่าคิดว่าเธอไม่มีใคร) 1994

Filmography
The Magic Shoes (รองต๊ะแล่บแปล๊บ) (lead role by Touch Na Takuatung directed by Prachya Pinkaew) March 14, 1992

Dramas

Series

References 

1992 establishments in Thailand
1994 disestablishments in Thailand
Thai boy bands
Musical groups from Bangkok
Thai dancers
Thai pop music groups
Musical groups established in 1992
Musical groups disestablished in 1994